Habenaria euryloba, commonly known as the small rein orchid, is a species of orchid that is endemic to a small area in far north Queensland. It has two or three leaves at its base and up to twenty small white flowers with a trident-like labellum.

Description 
Flowering occurs between December and February.

Taxonomy and naming
Habenaria euryloba was first formally described in 1998 by David Jones from a specimen collected near Cooktown in 1992 and the description was published in The Orchadian. The specific epithet (euryloba) is derived from the Ancient Greek words eurys meaning "broad", "wide" or "widespread" and lobos meaning "a rounded projection or protuberance".

Distribution and habitat
The small rein has a narrow distribution near Cooktown where it grows with sedges and rushes in summer-wet swamps and Melaleuca viridiflora wetland.

References

Orchids of Queensland
Endemic orchids of Australia
Plants described in 1998
euryloba